Sandra Chidinma Duru-Eluobi is a Nigerian businesswoman and founder of Pre-Adult Affairs Organization (PAAO).

`

Career
In business, she has been Managing Director/CEO of Sanchhy Nigeria Limited, Zest Media and Entertainment, and Executives Cable and Electronics Company, and managed a boutique in Lagos. In government, she played a role in the election of Rochas Okorocha as governor of Imo State in 2011 and has been an advisor to the Standards Organisation of Nigeria, the Police Women Unit, the Police Service Commission, and Kulfana Mining Company. In 2013 she considered forming her own political party and running for the state governorship herself.

She is the founder of Pre-Adult Affairs Organization, an NGO recognized by the United Nations; in 2015 she announced the launch of an associated TV programme aimed at 9–35-year-olds, Bare It Out! With Sandra Duru. In 2014, the Nigerian Ambassador to Ivory Coast, Ifeoma Akabogu-Chinwuba, honoured her for her "contributions to providing solutions to the unemployment, violence and educational problems in Nigeria". In 2016 she launched a new project, The Unity and Peace Project 2016–2020 (The Up Project).

Personal life
In 2014 she married Emmanuel Ebuka Eulobi, a footballer; their son was born in June 2016.

References

External links

Living people
1982 births
21st-century Nigerian businesswomen
21st-century Nigerian businesspeople
21st-century Nigerian politicians